Mirowski (feminine: Mirowska, plural: Mirowscy) is a Polish surname. Notable people with the surname include:

Michel Mirowski (1924–1990), Polish-born American physician
Philip Mirowski (born 1951), American historian and philosopher

Polish-language surnames